Tinus may refer to:
 Tinus (spider), a spider genus in the family Pisauridae (Nursery web spiders)
 Tinus, Iran, a village in Kerman Province, Iran

Tinus is also a short form of the given name Martinus and Marthinus. It may refer to:
 Tinus Bosselaar (1936–2018), Dutch footballer
 Tinus de Beer (born 1996), South African rugby player
 Tinus van Doorn (1905–1940), Dutch painter and graphic artist
 Tinus du Plessis (born 1984), Namibian rugby player
 Tinus van Gelder (1911–1999), Dutch cyclist
 Tinus de Jongh (1885–1942), Dutch and later South African painter
 Tinus Lambillion (1912–1994), Dutch boxer
 Tinus Linee (1969–2014), South African rugby player
 Tinus Osendarp (1916–2002), Dutch sprinter
 Tinus Pae (born 1989), Indonesian footballer

See also 
 Thinus
 Viburnum tinus, a plant species

Dutch masculine given names